Trochochaetidae is a family of polychaetes belonging to the order Spionida.

Genera:
 Cherusca Müller, 1858
 Nevaya McIntosh, 1911
 Trochochaeta Levinsen, 1884

References

Spionida